Johann Karl Hermann Gronau, from 1913 von Gronau, commonly known as Hans von Gronau (6 December 1850, in Alt Schadow – 22 February 1940, in Potsdam) was a Prussian officer, and General during World War I.

World War I
At the outbreak of World War I, Gronau was recalled from retirement to take command of the newly formed IV Reserve Corps as part of the 1st Army, commanded by General Alexander von Kluck. The army was the right wing of the forces that invaded France and Belgium as part of the Schlieffen Plan offensive in August 1914. His main objective was to cover the vulnerable right flank of the army. On 5 September, when the French 6th Army launched its surprise attack on Ourcq, a tributary of River Marne, they were brought under heavy fire by German guns. As darkness fell, von Gronau knew that he had won the necessary time to save the 1st Army from a surprise attack and retreated. Next day on 6 September, when the French attacked again, they found the German positions to be empty.

In September 1915, Gronau was appointed to command of XXXXI Reserve Corps, swapping places with Generalleutnant Arnold von Winckler. The corps was upgraded to form Armee-Gruppe Gronau on 20 September 1915. Gronau remained in concurrent command of the corps and the Armee-Gruppe. It served as part of the Army of the Bug throughout its existence. On 18 September 1916 the command was upgraded to form the Armee-Abteilung Gronau. It remained on the Eastern Front until dissolved on 27 March 1918.

On 4 October 1916 he was awarded the Pour le Mérite for military bravery. He was awarded the oak leaves,signifying a second award, on 6 August 1918.

Family
On 23 February 1890 Gronau married Luise Gerischer (20 July 1867 – 25 June 1926). The marriage produced three sons. His oldest son was the flight pioneer Wolfgang von Gronau who crossed the Atlantic Ocean from East to West flying a Dornier Wal D-1422 landing in the Hudson River on 26 August 1930.

Awards
 Iron Cross (1870) II class
 Iron Cross (1914) I class
 Pour le Mérite (4 October 1916) and Oak Leaves (6 August 1918)
 Order of the Red Eagle I class with Oak Leaves
 Order of the Crown I class

Glossary
Armee-Abteilung or Army Detachment in the sense of "something detached from an Army". It is not under the command of an Army so is in itself a small Army.
Armee-Gruppe or Army Group in the sense of a group within an Army and under its command, generally formed as a temporary measure for a specific task.
Heeresgruppe or Army Group in the sense of a number of armies under a single commander.

References

Bibliography 
 
 

1850 births
1940 deaths
Generals of Artillery (Prussia)
Recipients of the Pour le Mérite (military class)
German Army generals of World War I
Military personnel from Brandenburg
Recipients of the Iron Cross (1870), 2nd class
People from the Province of Brandenburg
Recipients of the Iron Cross (1914), 1st class